Azumah may refer to:

 Azumah Nelson (born 1958), Ghanaian boxer
 Jerry Azumah (born 1977), American footballer

See also

 Azumah-Mensah